Besser is the surname of:

 Astrid Besser
 Chaskel Besser (born 1923), Rabbi from Manhattan
 Jesse Besser, who invented a machine for making Besser blocks.
 Joe Besser (1907–1988), American comedian
 Hans Besser
 Hans Besser (chess player) (1935–2002), German chess master
 Howard Besser
 Les Besser, founder of Compact Software, the first RF and microwave EDA company
 Matt Besser (born 1967), best known from the sketch comedy show Upright Citizens Brigade
 Richard E. Besser
 Robert Dennis Besser, see Robert Denning
 Stuart M. Besser
 Wilibald Swibert Joseph Gottlieb von Besser (1784–1842), Austrian botanist

See also
 Besser Mfg. Co. v. United States
 Besser Museum for Northeast Michigan
 Besserer

German-language surnames